The men's 50 kilometres walk event at the 1948 Summer Olympic Games took place July 31.  The final was won by Swede John Ljunggren.

Records
Prior to the competition, the existing Olympic record was as follows.

Schedule
All times are British Summer Time (UTC+1)

Results

Key: DNF = Did not finish

References

Sources
Organising Committee for the XIV Olympiad, The (1948). The Official Report of the Organising Committee for the XIV Olympiad. LA84 Foundation. Retrieved 5 September 2016.

Athletics at the 1948 Summer Olympics
Racewalking at the Olympics
Men's events at the 1948 Summer Olympics